The National Food Authority (AKU) is a government agency under the supervision of the Albanian Ministry of Agriculture and Rural Development. The agency is responsible for ensuring the food security of the country and the stability of supply and price of food.

References 

Authority